Catapterix is a genus of moths, formerly considered monotypic, in the family Acanthopteroctetidae. Catapterix crimaea was its sole known species until the formal description of Catapterix tianshanica in 2016.

Its type species, C. crimaea, is found on the Crimea Peninsula in Ukraine. whereas C. tianshanica is described from Kyrgyzstan.

Taxonomy
Some authors place it in the monotypic family Catapterigidae.

References

Acanthoctesia
Glossata genera
Taxa named by Aleksei Konstantinovich Zagulyaev